The following list of highest historical scores in figure skating contains the highest scores earned before the 2018–2019 season under the ISU Judging System (IJS). The 2018–2019 season began on 1 July 2018. After the 2018-2019 season, the GOE was expanded to range between –5 and +5. Hence, the International Skating Union (ISU) have restarted all records from the 2018–2019 season and all previous statistics have been marked as "historical". Accordingly, this page lists only the highest scores achieved before the 2018–2019 season, using the –3/+3 GOE scoring range.

The following lists are included:
Records: current record holders; technical and component record scores; progression of record scores
Personal bests: highest personal best scores; highest PB technical element scores; highest PB program component scores
Absolute bests: lists of absolute best scores

Note: In the case of personal best lists, only one score is listed for any one skater, i.e. their personal best. The absolute best lists may include more than one score for the same skater.

The ISU only recognizes the best scores that are set at international competitions run under the ISU's rules, and does not recognize, for example, scores that are obtained at national figure skating championships. The competitions recognized by the ISU are: Winter Olympics (including the team event), Youth Olympics (including the team event), World Championships, World Junior Championships, European Championships, Four Continents Championships, GP events, Junior GP events, Challenger Series events, and World Team Trophy.

Record holders

Men

Women

Pairs

Ice dance

Historical ice dance (2003–2010) 
Prior to the 2010–2011 season, ice dance competitions included a compulsory dance and original dance (there was no short dance).

Technical and component record scores 

TES = Technical Element Score
PCS = Program Component Score

Men

Women

Pairs

Ice dance

Highest personal best scores 
The following lists include only personal best scores of skaters. To see lists where multiple scores from the same skater are included, see absolute best scores.

Note: ISU does not recognize scores which are skated at national championships.

Men

Best total scores 

All skaters whose personal best total score is above 260 points are listed here.

Best short program scores 

All skaters whose personal best short program score is above 90 points are listed here.

Best free program scores 

All skaters whose personal best free program score is above 176 points are listed here.

Ladies

Best total scores 

All skaters whose personal best total score is above 205 points are listed here.

Best short program scores 

All skaters whose personal best short program score is above 72 points are listed here.

Best free program scores 

All skaters whose personal best free program score is above 138 points are listed here.

Pairs

Best total scores 

All pairs teams whose personal best total score is above 205 points are listed here.

Best short program scores 

All pairs teams whose personal best short program score is above 72 points are listed here.

Best free program scores 

All pairs teams whose personal best free program score is above 135 points are listed here.

Ice dance

Best total scores 

All ice dance teams whose personal best total score is above 175 points are listed here.

Best short dance scores 

All ice dance teams whose personal best short dance score is above 70 points are listed here.

Best free dance scores 

All ice dance teams whose personal best free dance score is above 105 points are listed here.

Historical ice dance (2003–2010) 
Prior to the 2010–2011 season, ice dance competitions included a compulsory dance and original dance (there was no short dance).

Best total scores

Best compulsory dance scores

Best original dance scores

Best free dance scores

Absolute best scores 
These lists may include more than one score from an individual skater.

Men

Best total scores 

All scores above 297 points are listed here.

Best short program scores 

All short program scores above 103 points are listed here.

Best free program scores 

All free program scores above 198 points are listed here.

Ladies

Best total scores 

All scores above 220 points are listed here.

Best short program scores 

All short program scores above 77 points are listed here.

Best free program scores 

All free program scores above 147 points are listed here.

Pairs

Best total scores 

All scores above 225 points are listed here.

Best short program scores 

All short program scores above 79 points are listed here.

Best free program scores 

All free program scores above 148 points are listed here.

Ice dance

Best total scores 

All scores above 193 points are listed here.

Best short dance scores 

All short dance scores above 78 points are listed here.

Best free dance scores 

All free dance scores above 115 points are listed here.

Historical ice dance (2003–2010) 
Prior to the 2010–2011 season, ice dance competitions included a compulsory dance and original dance (there was no short dance).

Best total scores

Best compulsory dance scores

Best original dance scores

Best free dance scores

Progression of record scores 
The following lists are not exactly the same as what ISU have on their website. This is due to the fact that ISU lists scores as record scores even if previous skater had already scored a better score at the same competition. For example, ISU lists Takahiko Kozuka's free skating score of 180.79 points at the 2011 World Championships as a record despite the fact that Patrick Chan skated before Kozuka at that competition and scored 187.96 points. Another example, at the 2010 Winter Olympics both Aliona Savchenko / Robin Szolkowy in the short program and Shen Xue / Zhao Hongbo in the free skating are listed as previous record holders even though in both cases another pair skating ahead of them and earned a higher score. These kind of scores are not included in the following lists despite the fact that ISU list them as record scores.

Men

Total score 

Progression of men's combined total record score. This list starts from the skater who first scored above 210 points.

Short program score 

Progression of men's short program record score. This list starts from the skater who first scored above 70 points.

Free program score 

Progression of men's free skating record score. This list starts from the skater who first scored above 140 points.

Ladies

Total score 
Progression of ladies' combined total record score. This list starts from the skater who first scored above 170 points.

Short program score 

Progression of ladies' short program record score. This list starts from the skater who first scored above 60 points.

Free program score 

Progression of ladies' free skating record score. This list starts from the skater who first scored above 110 points.

Pairs

Total score 

Progression of pairs' combined total record score. This list starts from the pair who first scored above 170 points.

Short program score 

Progression of pairs' short program record score. This list starts from the pair who first scored above 60 points.

Free program score 

Progression of pairs' free skating record score. This list starts from the pair who first scored above 110 points.

Ice dance

Total score 

Progression of ice dance combined total record score. This list starts from the ice dance team who first scored above 150 points.

Short dance score 

Progression of short dance record score. This list starts from the ice dance team who first scored above 60 points.

Free dance score 

Progression of free dance record score. This list starts from the ice dance team who first scored above 90 points.

Historical ice dance (2003–2010) 
Prior to the 2010–2011 season, ice dance competitions included a compulsory dance and original dance (there was no short dance).

Total score 

Progression of ice dance combined total record score. This list starts from the ice dance team who first scored above 170 points.

Compulsory dance score 
Progression of compulsory dance record score. This list starts from the ice dance team who first scored above 40 points.

Original dance score 
Progression of original dance record score. This list starts from the ice dance team who first scored above 50 points.

Free dance score 
Progression of free dance record score. This list starts from the ice dance team who first scored above 90 points.

Highest personal best technical element scores 

TES = Technical Element Score

Men 

Short program

Free skating

Ladies 

Short program

Free skating

Pairs 

Short program

Free skating

Ice dance 

Short dance

Free dance

Highest personal best program component scores 

PCS = Program Component Score

Men 

Short program

Free skating

Ladies 

Short program

Free skating

Pairs 

Short program

Free skating

Ice dance 

Short dance

Free dance

Miscellaneous records and highest element scores 
GOE = Grade of Execution
BV = Base value

The base value of the element may have changed over time. An 'x' after the base value means that the base value has been multiplied by 1.1 because the jump was executed in the second half of the program.

Men 

Highest valued quadruples
All scores above 15.50 points are listed here.

Highest valued combos
All scores above 19.50 points are listed here.

Ladies 

Highest valued triple Axels
All scores above 9.00 points are listed here.

Highest valued quadruples

Highest valued combos
All scores above 13.50 points are listed here.

Pairs 

Highest valued quadruple twists
All scores above 10.00 points are listed here.

Highest valued quadruple throws and triple Axel throws
All scores above 9.00 points are listed here.

Highest valued jump combos
All scores above 9.00 points are listed here.

Highest scores achieved at main international events 
The ISU does not officially recognize championships records.

Winter Olympics 

Men

Ladies

Pairs

Ice dance

Winter Olympics – Team event 

Men

Ladies

Pairs

Ice dance

World Championships 

Men

Ladies

Pairs

Ice dance

European Championships 

Men

Ladies

Pairs

Ice dance

Four Continents 

Men

Ladies

Pairs

Ice dance

Grand Prix Final 

Men

Ladies

Pairs

Ice dance

World Team Trophy 

Men

Ladies

Pairs

Ice dance

See also 

 List of highest scores in figure skating
 List of highest junior scores in figure skating
 List of highest historical junior scores in figure skating
 ISU Judging System
 Figure skating records and statistics

References

External links 
 International Skating Union

Figure skating-related lists
Figure skating records and statistics